Kombissiri is a department or commune of Bazèga Province in central Burkina Faso. Its capital is the town of Kombissiri. According to the 2019 census the department has a total population of 77,756.

References

Departments of Burkina Faso
Bazèga Province